is purported to be a Japanese sumo wrestler in antiquity who is formally recognized as the first yokozuna. A legendary figure, his historical existence is disputed. He is said to have been active in the Kan'ei era (1624–1643).

He is said to have been born in Utsunomiya, Tochigi prefecture in central Japan, the son of Yamanouchi Shuzen, a samurai who served Sumaura Rinemon.

According to sumo folklore, he took part in a sumo tournament in Yotsuya, Tokyo in 1624 and became an instant star, enabling sumo organisers to charge admission for the first time. He is said to have been given the title of Hinoshita Kaisan (a Buddhist term signifying a man of exceptional power) by the third Tokugawa shōgun, Iemitsu.

By 1800 his legendary reputation as a huge and powerful rikishi had been solidified and his exploits were retold and embellished through the years. He became so legendary that when the 12th yokozuna Jinmaku Kyugoro came to compile the first list of yokozuna in 1900, Akashi was placed at the beginning, followed by two dominant champions from the Edo period, Ayagawa Goroji and Maruyama Gondazaemon. Despite this, Tanikaze was the first to receive a yokozuna licence and perform the yokozuna dohyo-iri and so is often regarded as the first "real" yokozuna.

See also
Glossary of sumo terms
List of past sumo wrestlers
List of yokozuna

References

External links

 Article on Akashi Shiganosuke

1600s births
1649 deaths
Japanese sumo wrestlers
People from Utsunomiya, Tochigi
Sumo people from Tochigi Prefecture
Yokozuna
17th-century wrestlers